Janne "JB" Christoffersson is a Swedish singer and guitarist. He was the singer for the stoner metal band Spiritual Beggars and plays guitar and sings for the heavy metal band Grand Magus. In August 2013, JB was announced as a guest on the Ayreon album The Theory of Everything.

References 

Swedish heavy metal guitarists
Swedish male singers
Living people
Spiritual Beggars members
Year of birth missing (living people)